Huilong Township is a township of Fang County in northwestern Hubei province, China, located  southwest of the county seat and  south of Shiyan as the crow flies. , it has seven villages under its administration.

Administrative Divisions
Villages:
 Shisan, Hongxing ('Red star village'), Hongwei ('Red Guards village'), Ershi, Hongqi ('Red Flag village'), Heizhanggou, Guqiaogou

Demographics 
As of the 2010 Chinese Census, Huilong Township has a population of 3,022. In the 2000 Chinese Census, Huilong Township had a population of 4,850.

Huilong Township has a hukou population of 6,402 as of 2019, up from 6,388 in 2018.

See also 
 List of township-level divisions of Hubei

References 

Township-level divisions of Hubei
Fang County